DJV may refer to

Don't Just Vote, Get Active
Deutsches Jungvolk
Deshapremi Janatha Viyaparaya, Sri Lanka
Deutscher Journalisten-Verband (DJV) or German Journalists Association